Nils Einar Lind, nicknamed "Nisse" or "Bagarn" (October 27, 1904 in Stockholm – October 25, 1941 in Stockholm) was a Swedish jazz accordionist and pianist. He recorded frequently in the 1930s and was a regular performer on radio and film soundtracks up to the time of his death.

Filmography
1932 – Jag gifta mig – aldrig
1935 – Munkbrogreven
1936 – Alla tiders Karlsson
1937 – En flicka kommer till sta'n
1937 – Familjen Andersson
1940 – Kronans käcka gossar

Swedish jazz musicians
Jazz accordionists
Musicians from Stockholm